Struga is a part of the Szczecin City, Poland situated on the right bank of Oder river, east of the Szczecin Old Town, and south-east of Szczecin-Dąbie.

History

Hohenkrug near Stettin was the first village in the Duchy of Pomerania clearly recorded as German (villa teutonicorum) in 1173, at the beginning of the medieval German settlement of Pomerania (Ostsiedlung).

References

Struga